Isinda was a town of ancient Lycia. Isinda formed a political union (Sympoliteia) with three neighboring cities Aperlae (which was the union's seat), Apollonia and Simena.

Its site is located near Belenli, Asiatic Turkey. The city was located on a hill above Belenli, where remains of a city wall and other buildings are preserved, as well as some Lycian pillars and rock tombs.

References

Populated places in ancient Lycia
Former populated places in Turkey
Archaeological sites in Turkey
Kaş District